Untouchable is a 2019 British documentary film about film producer Harvey Weinstein and the sexual abuse allegations that involve him. It was directed by Ursula Macfarlane.

Summary
The film focuses on interviews with Weinstein’s accusers, including Rosanna Arquette, Paz de la Huerta, and Erika Rosenbaum.

Interviewees
The following is a list of people who were interviewed, listed alphabetically:

Rosanna Arquette
Ken Auletta
A. J. Benza
Mike Bodie
Hope Exiner D'Amore
Kathy Declesis
Caitlin Dulany
Abby Ex
Ronan Farrow
Mark Gill
Louise Godbold
Andrew Goldman
Paz de la Huerta
Jodi Kantor
Nannette Klatt
Jack Lechner
Kim Masters
Lauren O'Connor
Mickey Osterreicher
Zelda Perkins
Erika Rosenbaum
John Schmidt
Rebecca Traister
Megan Twohey

Archive footage (uncredited)
In the film, actors and actresses also appear for whom archival date was used. Who played themselves. They were also credited. This is Ben Affleck, Gillian Anderson, Asia Argento, Kate Beckinsale, Roberto Benigni, Juliette Binoche, Tom Cruise, Penelope Cruz, Uma Thurman, Nicole Kidman etc.

Release
The film's festival debut at the 2019 Sundance Film Festival was followed by Hulu's acquisition of distribution rights, who released the film on 2 September 2019.

Reception
On the review aggregator website Rotten Tomatoes, the film has  approval rating, based on  reviews. The website's consensus reads, "While subsequent documentaries on the subject might be more comprehensive, Untouchable offers a gut-wrenching look at horrific abuses of power." 

Writing for Entertainment Weekly, Leah Greenblatt called the film "[a] methodical, unmissable takedown." 

Sharon Waxman of TheWrap wrote, "What director Ursula Macfarlane’s film does best is place the Weinstein scandal in context, revisiting the early years of Bob and Harvey, two brothers set on challenging the staid parameters of Hollywood filmmaking by making bold choices and supporting daring writer-directors."

References

External links
 
 Sundance Festival page

2019 films
British documentary films
Documentary films about film directors and producers
2010s English-language films
Sexual abuse
2010s British films
Films about sexual harassment
Works about the Harvey Weinstein sexual abuse allegations